Reformatory is a 1938 American crime drama film directed by Lewis D. Collins and starring Jack Holt, Bobby Jordan and Charlotte Wynters.

Plot
The inmates at a juvenile detention institution plan a mass breakout, despite the attempts of a new superintendent to bring in a more liberal regime.

Cast
 Jack Holt as Robert Dean 
 Bobby Jordan as Pinkey Leonard 
 Charlotte Wynters as Adele Webster 
 Grant Mitchell as Arnold Frayne 
 Tommy Bupp as Fibber Regan 
 Frankie Darro as Louie Miller 
 Ward Bond as Mac Grady 
 Sheila Bromley as Mrs. Regan 
 Vernon Dent as Cook Howard 
 Greta Granstedt as Millie 
 Paul Everton as Gov. Spaulding 
 Lloyd Ingraham as Doctor Blakely 
 Joe Caits as Jim Leonard

References

Bibliography
  Timothy Shary & Robin Mcinnes. Teen Movies: American Youth on Screen. Wallflower Press, 2005.

External links
 

1938 films
1938 crime drama films
1930s English-language films
American crime drama films
Films directed by Lewis D. Collins
Columbia Pictures films
1930s American films